Hill of Ben is a rising hill situated in the Westmeath Hills, Ireland. The Hill of Ben dominates the valley where Fore Abbey resides. It rises sharply among the other surrounding hills that interlace with the many loughs of Westmeath to an elevation of 627'. Local legend has it that Saint Patrick's successor, named Benigne, is said to have preached from the hill to bring the gospel to local communities.

References

Mountains and hills of County Westmeath